A Lua Me Disse (English: Once in a Blue Moon) is a 2005 brazilian telenovela created by Miguel Falabella and Maria Carmem Barbosa, and starring Adriana Esteves and Wagner Moura.

Overview 
Heloísa (Adriana Esteves) is a baby-sitter hired to work at Regina‘s mansion. There, she meets Ricardo and Gustavo (Wagner Moura), who both fall in love with her. Ricardo reveals himself to Heloísa, but Gustavo represses his feelings.
 
Heloísa and Ricardo have an affair and she gets pregnant, but his spiteful mother Ester (Zezé Polessa) forbids him to marry the nanny. After a heated discussion with his mother, Ricardo drives off in his car and dies in a tragic accident.
 
Heloísa raises her child by herself, suffering retaliation by Ester. When Heloísa, Ester and Gustavo meet to clarify the past, he reveals he has always loved Heloísa, much to his mother‘s displeasure and despair. Heloisa and Gustavo know their love story is struggle to prevent anything from happening. How the many twists and turns of this story unfold... only time will tell.

Cast

Special guests

References

External links 
 Official website

2005 Brazilian television series debuts
2005 Brazilian television series endings
2005 telenovelas
Brazilian telenovelas
Brazilian LGBT-related television shows
Portuguese-language telenovelas
TV Globo telenovelas